Arvid Wam Solvang (born July 14, 1969) is a Norwegian songwriter/producer living in Oslo, Norway.

Biography
Arvid Wam Solvang was born July 14, 1969, in Kopervik, Norway. After touring Norway for years as a guitarist with a range of different bands, he started a music production company called Viagram. Solvang is known for his work with Maria Mena where he has co-written most of her songs, and produced her first three albums. He has also co-written and produced the first albums for Norwegian artist Christel Alsos.

Solvang is signed to EMI music publishing. He is currently a board member at The Norwegian Society of Composers and Lyricists (NOPA), and he is in the election committee for The organization for Norwegian artists and professional musicians (GRAMART).

Discography
2002 Maria Mena - Another Phase
2004 Maria Mena - Mellow
2004 Maria Mena - White Turns Blue
2004 Kristian Valen - Listen When Alone
2005 Maria Mena - Apparently Unaffected
2005 Vidar Johnsen - Dance of Lust
2007 Christel Alsos - Closing the Distance
2007 Vidar Johnsen og Peter Nordberg - Ord och ögonblick
2008 Vidar Johnsen og Peter Nordberg - Mål & Mening
2009 Vidar Johnsen og Peter Nordberg - I Ild Og Vatten
2010 Christel Alsos - Tomorrow is
2012 Vidar Johnsen - Galskapens land

References

External links 
 Viagram AS
 Arvid Solvang at MySpace

1969 births
Living people
Norwegian record producers
Norwegian songwriters